This is a list of universities and colleges in Croatia.

Public universities
Josip Juraj Strossmayer University of Osijek
Juraj Dobrila University of Pula
University of Dubrovnik
University North
University of Rijeka
University of Slavonski Brod
University of Split
University of Zadar
University of Zagreb

Public polytechnics
Polytechnic of Šibenik
Međimurje Polytechnic in Čakovec
Polytechnic in Karlovac
Polytechnic in Požega
Polytechnic in Rijeka
Polytechnic in Varaždin
"Lavoslav Ružička" Polytechnic in Vukovar
Polytechnic "Marko Marulić" in Knin
Polytechnic "Nikola Tesla" in Gospić
Polytechnic of Zagreb
Polytechnic School for Social Sciences at Zagreb
Professional Health School of Higher Education in Zagreb

Public colleges
College of Agriculture in Križevci
College of Computer Science Management in Virovitica
Police College

Private universities
Catholic University of Croatia
Libertas University
VERN' University
 Algebra University College

Private polytechnics
Polytechnic "Baltazar Adam Krčelić", Zaprešić
Polytechnic "Hrvatsko zagorje" Krapina
Polytechnic Velika Gorica

Private colleges
RIT Croatia
Business College for Management in Tourism and Hospitality
Business College "Minerva"
Business School PAR
Business College with Public Rights, Višnjan
Business School "Zagreb"
College for Inspection and Human Resource Management in Maritime Sciences
College for Safety at Workplace
College of AGORA
College of Applied Computing
College of Economics, Entrepreneurship and Management "Zrinski"
College of Information Technology Zagreb
College of International Relations and Diplomacy
College of Management and Design "Aspira"
Effectus - College for Finances and Law
International Graduate Business School Zagreb
Kairos College for Public Relations and Media Studies
Professional Business School of Higher Education LIBERTAS
Professional School of Higher Education for Business Administration Studies
Professional School of Higher Education for Technology in Pula
RRiF College of Financial Management
Technical College in Bjelovar
TV Academy - College of Multimedia and Communication in Split
Zagreb College of Journalism
Zagreb Polytechnic College
Zagreb School of Economics and Management

Other institutions
Vinkovci Technical College of Adult Education

See also
 Education in Croatia
 List of schools in Croatia

References

 http://www.studyincroatia.hr/studying-in-croatia/institutions-and-programmes/institution

Universities
Croatia

Croatia